Alina Kouszyk is a Belarusian journalist and TV host for Belsat TV. She became a member of the Belarusian United Transitional Cabinet with responsibility for National Revival on 16 September 2022.

Childhood and education
Kouszyk studied history and teaching English at Yanka Kupala State University of Grodno and politics at the University of Warsaw.

Television
Kouszyk started work for Belsat TV around 2007, as a host of TV shows including Belsat Studio, PraSvet and 54% and as a journalist.

Cultural organising
Kouszyk organised Belarusian cultural activities in Warsaw, including the co-founding of the Centre for Belarusian Solidarity and InBelKult 2.0.

United Transitional Cabinet
On 16 September 2022, Kouszyk was nominated to the Belarusian United Transitional Cabinet with responsibility for National Revival, to develop Belarusian culture and education.

References

Living people
Belarusian politicians
Year of birth missing (living people)